Couach fast interceptor boats are patrol boats being built by the French shipyard Chantier Naval Couach  for the Indian Navy.

Background
On 27 March 2010, in the wake of the 2008 Mumbai attacks, the Indian Navy placed an order worth around 600m rupees (US$13.2m) for 15 boats with Chantier Naval Couach, to improve their coastal security net.

Vessel

Deployment
The first three interceptor boats were inducted by the Indian Navy in Mumbai during the last week of June 2011. Twelve more are due to be inducted by the end of 2012. These boats will be utilised by various Indian Navy units to patrol and intercept suspicious vessels closed to vital domestic assets.

See also
Solas Marine Fast Interceptor Boat
ABG Interceptor Class fast attack crafts
Cochin Fast Patrol Vessels
L&T fast interceptor craft
Rajshree class inshore patrol vessel
Rani Abbakka Class
Alcock Ashdown Survey Catamaran
Manoram class ferry

References

Fast attack craft of the Indian Navy